Mastny (Czech: Mastný, feminine Mastná) is a Czech surname. Notable people with this surname include:

 Tom Mastny (born 1981), American baseball player
 Vojtěch Mastný (1874-1954), Czechoslovak diplomat
 Vojtech Mastny (historian) (born 1936), Czech-American historian

See also
 

Czech-language surnames